Acrolophus schistodes is a moth of the family Acrolophidae. It is found in South America.

References

Moths described in 1913
Taxa named by Edward Meyrick
schistodes